{{DISPLAYTITLE:C5H6O4}}
The molecular formula C5H6O4 (molar mass: 130.10 g/mol) may refer to:

 Citraconic acid
 Glutaconic acid
 Itaconic acid, or methylidenesuccinic acid
 Mesaconic acid
 Monomethyl fumarate